Batman: The Killing Joke is a 2016 American adult animated thriller superhero film produced by Warner Bros. Animation and distributed by Warner Bros. Pictures. Featuring the DC Comics character Batman, the film is the 26th film of the DC Universe Animated Original Movies, based on the graphic novel of the same name by Alan Moore and Brian Bolland. The film is directed by Sam Liu, written by Brian Azzarello and stars the voices of Kevin Conroy, Mark Hamill, Tara Strong, and Ray Wise. Like the novel, the film follows the Joker's undertaking to drive police commissioner James Gordon insane, and Batman's desperate attempts to stop him.

Development of a film adaptation of the novel began in 2009; however, production was stalled due to the under-performance of DC's live-action adaptation of Moore's Watchmen. In 2011, Hamill expressed interest in reprising his role of the Joker for the adaptation, resulting in a fan campaign for its production. In 2015, producer Bruce Timm confirmed that an animated feature based on the book was in development. It is the first Batman film and Warner Bros. Animation film (as well as the first of the DCUAOM) to be rated R by the MPAA.

The film premiered at the San Diego Comic-Con on July 22, 2016. Originally intended to be released directly on home video, due to its popularity, the film was instead released simultaneously in theaters and digitally on July 25, 2016, for a special one-night event, before a DVD and Blu-ray release on August 2, 2016. It grossed $4.4 million worldwide, and it became the 9th highest-grossing R-rated animated film worldwide. The film  received criticism for it's characterization of Batgirl, the prologue, and animation style compared to it's source material, though praise was given towards some of the voice cast.

Plot
While out on patrol, Barbara Gordon (Batgirl) fails to stop a robbery, but manages to stop one criminal with help from Batman. Paris Franz, the robbers' leader and the nephew of a powerful mob boss, develops a dangerous obsession with her and starts sending her messages. After Franz tricks her into finding his uncle's dead body, Batman becomes concerned about her safety and takes her off the case, telling her that she will eventually be tempted to kill the criminals she pursues. Outraged, Batgirl attacks Batman physically and verbally, which leads to them having sex. A few nights later, Batgirl tries to apologize to Batman, but he is ambushed by Franz and his men, prompting her to come to his aid. When she arrives and overpowers Franz, he makes her lose control and give him a savage beating, stopping just short of killing him. Realizing Batman was right, she retires from crime-fighting.

Later, Batman investigates a murder scene with Detective Harvey Bullock and concludes that the Joker, currently held at Arkham Asylum, might be behind the crime. He goes to Arkham to talk to him, only to discover that he has escaped and put a decoy in his place. Joker then attacks Barbara and her father, Commissioner James Gordon. He shoots her in the stomach, paralyzing her from the waist down, and takes Gordon to an abandoned amusement park. There, Joker strips him naked and subjects him to torture, including showing him photos he took of Barbara, naked and in pain.

The story is intercut with flashbacks of Joker's origin. It is revealed that he was once a lab technician who quit his job to become a stand-up comedian, only to fail miserably. Desperate to support his pregnant wife Jeannie, he agrees to help two criminals rob his former workplace. The criminals tell him that he has to use the Red Hood's mask and caped costume, secretly intending to frame him. During the planning, the police inform him that Jeannie and their unborn child have died in a household accident. Grief-stricken, he tries to withdraw from the plan, but the criminals strong-arm him into keeping his commitment to them.

At the plant, the criminals and the costumed comedian run into security personnel, and a shootout occurs. The criminals are gunned down and the comedian is confronted by Batman. Terrified, the comedian trips and falls into the chemical plant's waste pond, and is swept through a pipe leading to the outside. As he removes his mask, he sees the chemicals have permanently disfigured his face, giving him a clown-like appearance. His disfigurement, combined with the loss of his family, and what he had experienced in the chemical plant drives him insane and transforms him into the Joker.

In the present, Batman finds and saves Gordon, while the Joker flees. Despite his ordeal, Gordon remains sane and demands that Batman capture the Joker "by the book". Batman follows the Joker as the latter tries to persuade him that the world is just one big joke and that "one bad day" is enough to drive an ordinary man insane. Batman subdues Joker, tells him that Gordon has remained sane, and concludes that Joker is alone in his madness. He then attempts to reach out to him, offering rehabilitation. Joker apologetically declines, saying it is too late for him.

Joker then says that the situation reminds him of a joke about two patients in an insane asylum who try to escape by leaping over to the adjoining building. The first patient makes it across, but the second patient is afraid that he will fall. The first patient gets an idea: "Hey, I got this flashlight with me. I'll just shine it across the gap between the buildings and you can walk across the beam and join me." The second patient questions the idea: "What do you think I am, crazy? You'll just turn it off when I'm halfway across!" Initially stoic, Batman soon joins Joker in having a good laugh at the joke. As the police arrive, the Joker's laugh trails off, but Batman continues to laugh.

Cast 

 Kevin Conroy as Bruce Wayne / Batman
 Mark Hamill as Joker / Red Hood 
 Tara Strong as Barbara Gordon / Batgirl
 Ray Wise as Commissioner James Gordon
 Robin Atkin Downes as Detective Harvey Bullock
 John DiMaggio as Carlos Francesco
 Brian George as Alfred Pennyworth
 J.P. Karliak as Reese
 Andrew Kishino as Murray
 Nolan North as Mitch
 Maury Sterling as Parry Francesco / Paris Franz
 Fred Tatasciore as Carnival Owner
 Bruce Timm as Patrolman
 Anna Vocino as Jeannie
 Kari Wahlgren as Call Girl
 Rick D. Wasserman as Sal Maroni

Production 
In 2011, during San Diego Comic-Con, actor Mark Hamill, who wanted to quit playing the Joker at that time, stated that he would be willing to voice the Joker for an adaptation of The Killing Joke, encouraging fans to campaign for said adaptation, most notably in a tweet on October 24, 2011. Since then, a Facebook page titled "Petition to get Mark Hamill to play the Joker in animated Killing Joke" was set up by his fans. In 2013, Bruce Timm also expressed a desire to create the project, saying it was only a possibility. On July 10, 2015, during the Justice League: Gods and Monsters panel at San Diego Comic-Con, Timm announced that an animated film based on the novel was in development and slated to be released in 2016. Sam Liu would direct and Timm would executive produce the film. The film features a 15-minute prologue that sets up the story. On July 17, Hamill tweeted that he had his "fingers crossed" in hopes that he would be contacted to reprise his role as the Joker. On July 27, Collider reported that Hamill would voice the Joker in the film and ComicBook.com spoke with Kevin Conroy who stated he would reprise his voice role as Bruce Wayne / Batman "in a heartbeat". On March 14, 2016, it was officially announced that Conroy, Hamill and Tara Strong would reprise their roles as Batman, Joker and Barbara Gordon, and Ray Wise would voice Commissioner Gordon. The rest of the voice cast was revealed on Apple's iTunes digital release of the film.

In January 2016, Timm revealed that the film would be screened at San Diego Comic-Con in July. He added that the team had to "add a lot more story" for the film due to the source novel not being long enough to make a feature-length film. Month later, concept artist Phil Bourassa revealed that in 2009, Timm was slated to produce an R-rated version of The Killing Joke, but development on the film was stalled after two weeks due to the under-performance of Watchmen, while also showcasing concept art of the Joker. In April, Warner Home Video confirmed that The Killing Joke would be the first film in the DC Universe Animated Original Movies series and the first Batman film to receive an R rating from the MPAA, with Warner Bros. Animation and Warner Digital Series president Sam Register explaining, "From the start of production, we encouraged producer Bruce Timm and our team at Warner Bros. Animation to remain faithful to the original story—regardless of the eventual MPAA rating... We felt it was our responsibility to present our core audience—the comics-loving community—with an animated film that authentically represented the tale they know all too well."

In terms of animation production, the crew admitted that trying to adapt Bolland's art style was challenging due to the realistic quality; they then sought out another artist with a simpler yet very similar style that would be easier to animate, settling on Kevin Nowlan.

The animation was done by The Answer Studio Co. LTD, an outsourced studio in Japan.

Release 
Warner Home Video hosted the world premiere of The Killing Joke during the 2016 San Diego Comic-Con on July 22, 2016. The film was released digitally on July 26, 2016, while the deluxe edition and combo pack Blu-ray of the film was released on August 2, 2016. On June 8, 2016, Fathom Events and Vue cinemas announced they would release the film in select theaters for one night only on July 25, 2016, throughout the US and the UK. On July 18, 2016, Fathom Events announced that the film would receive an additional two showings on July 26 due to "unprecedented demand." It also received a limited release in Australia, New Zealand and Mexico on July 24, 2016.

Batman: The Killing Joke grossed $3.8 million in the United States and Canada and $586,038 in other countries, for a total gross of $4.4 million. In the US, the film grossed $3.2 million on the first night of the Fathom Events screenings and became the biggest theatrical event in Fathom's history. The film earned $2,910,693 from domestic DVD sales and $5,743,188 from domestic Blu-ray sales, bringing its total domestic home video earnings to $8,653,881.

Reception
The site's critics' consensus reads: "This stilted retelling of the Joker's origin adds little to its iconic source material, further diminished by some questionable story additions that will have fans demanding justice for Barbara Gordon."

Ben Travers of IndieWire commented that "instead of humanizing her, [the prologue] turns Barbara/Batgirl into a comic book cliché: the female character that feigns complexity, but, when given an expanded role, is only viewed through a sexual lens." Tommy Cook of Collider wrote that the prologue "feels tonally jarring tacked on haphazardly to The Killing Joke."

Many critics and fans agreed the first half of the film felt unnecessary and disconnected to the second half. Jesse Schedeen of IGN wrote, "The creep factor comes from the fact that Batgirl has such a clearly subordinate relationship to Batman. He's the seasoned veteran and mentor. She's the newbie pupil... Worst of all, none of this opening act has any real bearing on the remainder of the film. Batgirl still comes across as a sacrificial lamb in the end. Her insipid romantic drama adds no weight to her eventual trauma."

In response to criticism of the prologue, Azzarello stated, "The thing about this is that it's controversial, so we added more controversy." Bruce Timm further added:

We were aware that it's a little risky. There's definitely some stuff in that first part of the movie that's going to be controversial. Here's where we came down on that specific issue: It was really important to us to show that both of the characters make some pretty big mistakes. I mean, his "parental skills" aren't that great. Maybe never having had any kids of his own, he doesn't realize that if you tell a kid to not do something, they're going to want to do it even more. And then she makes some mistakes and then he kind of overreacts to her mistakes and then she overreacts to his overreaction. So it's very human; it's a very understandable story. It's tricky because it's messy, because relationships are sometimes messy. But to me and to Alan and Brian, it was all very fascinating to us to explore that angle.

Gavia Baker-Whitelaw of The Daily Dot wrote of the art and animation: "Each scene is recreated with painstaking accuracy, but DC's animation style does not measure up to the impact of Brian Bolland's 1980s noir aesthetic."

The film's voice acting and faithfulness to the source material in the second half were received more positively. Nick Bosworth of JoBlo.com wrote that "the best strength of this film however hands down in the voice talent behind it. Kevin Conroy is in top form returning as Bruce Wayne … and of course Mark Hamill as Joker."

References

External links 

 
 

 
 
 Batman: The Killing Joke at The World's Finest

2016 films
Adult animated superhero films
2010s American animated films
2010s animated superhero films
American adult animated films
American mystery films
American crime drama films
Animated action films
Animated Batman films
DC Universe Animated Original Movies
2010s English-language films
Films based on works by Alan Moore
Films produced by Sam Register
Films directed by Sam Liu
Films set in amusement parks
Warner Bros. films
Warner Bros. Animation animated films
Animated films about revenge